Batuliya Point (‘Nos Batuliya’ \'nos ba-'tu-li-ya\) is an ice-free tipped point forming the east extremity of Robert Island and the south side of the entrance to Tsepina Cove in the South Shetland Islands, Antarctica.

The point, projecting 550 m into Bransfield Strait, is situated 5.4 km northeast of the southeast extremity of Robert Point, 3 km north-northeast of Sadala Point, and 1.9 km south (and a trifle to the east) of Kitchen Point.

The feature is named after the settlement of Batuliya in western Bulgaria.

Location
Bulgarian mapping in 2009.

Map
 L.L. Ivanov. Antarctica: Livingston Island and Greenwich, Robert, Snow and Smith Islands. Scale 1:120000 topographic map.  Troyan: Manfred Wörner Foundation, 2009.

References
 Batuliya Point. SCAR Composite Gazetteer of Antarctica.
 Bulgarian Antarctic Gazetteer. Antarctic Place-names Commission. (details in Bulgarian, basic data in English)

External links
 Batuliya Point. Copernix satellite image

Headlands of Robert Island
Bulgaria and the Antarctic